Justin Fletcher  (born 15 June 1970) is an English actor, comedian, singer and television presenter appearing mainly on the BBC pre-school television channel CBeebies. Speaking and performing in various, often self-created, roles, he specialises in slapstick comedy and works with children with special needs through his show Something Special. Fletcher also appears as the award-winning comedian Mr Tumble.

Biography
Fletcher was born on 15 June 1970 in Reading, Berkshire, the son of Guy Fletcher. He has three sisters and one brother. He attended Theale Green School. He currently lives in Winnersh, Wokingham, Berkshire.

Career
Fletcher worked for Sounds Good in Theale as a cassette duplicating machine operator and generally amused his co-workers with his characterisations.

While in his final year studying drama at the Guildford School of Acting, Fletcher started to regularly watch Phillip Schofield in the BBC One broom cupboard with Gordon the Gopher and decided that a career in children's television was for him. He then met Schofield, who suggested that he should make a show reel to showcase to television executives.

He sketched out various comedic characters and put together a Showreel called Justin Time which encompassed two different characters: Anna Conda, a myopic reptile-house warden; and Arthur Sleep, a regional newsreader who has difficulty staying awake and can sleep anywhere no matter what. Both characters were used for his CBeebies show Gigglebiz. His first television show after graduation was Fun Song Factory for GMTV, working with Dave Benson Phillips (he had earlier done Playdays on the stage after its cancellation, portraying the character Mr. Jolly). The television show was sent to various broadcasters and production companies.

BBC and CBeebies

He was part of the Tikkabilla programme, out of which was spun Higgledy House, a slapstick comedy for children with Sarah-Jane Honeywell, which progressed to the very popular Mr Tumble. Fletcher has also voiced the characters of Doodles and Jake in Tweenies, Miguel in Finley the Fire Engine, Sleeping Bear and Growling Tiger in CBeebies' Boo!, and additional voices in Todd World, Shaun the Sheep, and Timmy Time.  In 2006, Fletcher became a presenter on CBeebies but left in 2007.

Fletcher developed Something Special through his own production company, and he presents it while signing in Makaton.

In November 2008, CBeebies aired three different pilots made by Fletcher, with the possibility of one of them becoming a full-time series. They were called Humphrey the Painter, Gigglebiz, and Captain Adorable.  In January 2009, an announcement by CBeebies was made that Gigglebiz would become the regular show, starting in September 2009, with the Humphrey and Captain Adorable characters being included, which was now a series of character-based comedy sketches linked by jokes told by children.

His voice-over work for CBBC includes voicing Harold from Thomas the Tank Engine, which he has performed on BBC Radio 4, arena tour, and pantomime. Fletcher is a relief continuity presenter for CBeebies' presentation links and regularly performed on the CBeebies radio station on BBC Radio 7 until its change to BBC Radio 4 Extra in 2011.

Fletcher also appears as himself, along with a range of animated characters, in the Bee Bright series of award-winning educational DVDs.

Fletcher also occasionally appears in a show called The Hollies School.

Justin's House
In October 2011, CBeebies began broadcasting Justin's House, starring Fletcher with Steven Kynman as "Robert the Robot" and Jane Deane as "Dee Livery". The show is based in Justin's fictional house and recorded live in front of a studio audience.

Ratings
Episode ratings from BARB:

Other work

Starting in 1998, Fletcher presented the Fun Song Factory for the GMTV series for a year as his first full-time presenting role. He later returned to the show in 2004 as the voice of Ozzy.

Also in 1998, Fletcher sang several songs as well as the theme tune to the children's stop motion animated series Tom and Vicky.

He owns a production company called Scrumptious House, which has released a DVD called Let's Sing Nursery Rhymes with Justin Fletcher.

In the CITV channel programme Jim Jam and Sunny, he is the voice of both Jim Jam and Slim the cowardly giraffe.

His voice appears on the VTech Alphabet Desk, Turn and Learn Driver and the Bob the Builder phones, the children's train ride at Animal Farm Country Park near Burnham-on-Sea, and a number of Crick Software titles.

From December 2009 to January 2010, Fletcher played the character Buttons in Cinderella at the Capitol Theatre in Horsham, West Sussex. From December 2010 to January 2011, he played the character Josh the Jester in the pantomime Sleeping Beauty at The Hexagon theatre in Reading, Berkshire. From December 2011 to January 2012, he played the character Wishy Washy in the pantomime Aladdin at the Hexagon theatre in Reading. Fletcher has since performed in numerous pantomimes at the venue, including Cinderella, Sleeping Beauty, Beauty and the Beast, and Peter Pan,
as well as the 2022 pantomime Jack and the Beanstalk.
He also attends festivals, such as Camp Bestival in Dorset, to entertain children. Justin is a patron for Bournemouth-based performing arts school Stagewise.

His debut album Hands Up the Album reached number 16 in the UK Albums Chart on 11 March 2012. In March 2013, he released his second album Best Friends. In January 2015, he released his third album Just Party.

On 12 September 2015, he appeared on Pointless Celebrities and got knocked out in the second round.

Fletcher presented a daily radio show on Fun Kids weekdays from 9 am to 10 am called Justin's Word.

Awards

Orders of Chivalry
Fletcher was appointed Member of the Order of the British Empire (MBE) in the 2008 Birthday Honours for services to "children's broadcasting and the voluntary sector".

Professional awards
 BAFTA Children's Awards 2007
 Nominated as Best Presenter for Something Special

 BAFTA Children's Awards 2008
 Awarded Best Presenter for Something Special

 BAFTA Childrens Awards 2009<ref
name=bafta_2009>
</ref>
Awarded Best Presenter for Something Special and Bee Bright

 BAFTA Children's Awards 2010
 Awarded Best Presenter for Something Special
 Nominated Best Performer for Gigglebiz

 BAFTA Children's Awards 2011
 Nominated Best Presenter for Something Special

 BAFTA Children's Awards 2012
 Awarded the Flynn Rossiter award for entertainment

Filmography

Live performances 
 Playdays
 1997, as Mr. Jolly (live stage show only)

 Camp Bestival
 2009
 2010
 2011
 2012
 2015

 Justin's Party Tour
 2017, playing 27 theatres over 31 days

 Butlins
 2017
2019-22

References

External links

1970 births
Living people
20th-century English male actors
21st-century English male actors
Alumni of the Guildford School of Acting
English male comedians
English male television actors
English male voice actors
English television personalities
Members of the Order of the British Empire
People from Reading, Berkshire